An Act to amend the Criminal Code (trafficking in persons) (commonly known as Bill C-310) is a statute passed by the Canadian Parliament in 2012. It amended the Criminal Code to enable the Government of Canada to prosecute Canadians for trafficking in persons while outside of Canada.

Joy Smith, Member of Parliament for Kildonan—St. Paul in Manitoba, introduced Bill C-310 as a private member's bill in the fall of 2011. Smith hoped that the bill would help combat human trafficking globally in a way that could not be accomplished by simply addressing issues relating to border control and immigration to Canada.  The first reading of the bill took place on October 3 of that year during the 41st Canadian Parliament. Although private member's bills rarely are enacted, Bill C-310 was passed by Parliament and received royal assent on June 28, 2012.

During debates in the House of Commons on the bill, it received broad support across party lines.

On April 27, 2012, the bill was sent to the Senate with unanimous support from MPs. That June, UNICEF Canada submitted a brief to the Canadian Senate Standing Committee on Legal and Constitutional Affairs relating to Bill C-310. On June 22, 2012, the bill passed third reading in the Senate, and then royal assent on June 28, 2012.

A year later, on May 6, 2013, Naomi Krueger of The Salvation Army appeared as a witness at before the Canadian House of Commons Standing Committee on Justice and Human Rights.  Krueger was the manager of Deborah's Gate, a safe house for human trafficking victims run by the Salvation Army in Vancouver, British Columbia.  She testified to the Committee that Bill C-310 "created opportunities to better support ... the victims whom we serve on a day-to-day basis at Deborah's Gate."

References

2012 in Canadian politics
41st Canadian Parliament
Human trafficking in Canada
Canadian federal legislation
2012 in international relations
Foreign relations of Canada
Canadian criminal law
International criminal law
Conservative Party of Canada
2012 in Canadian law